Margot von Schlieffen (26 May 1921 – 28 February 2014) was a German film editor. She worked on thirty five films and television series between 1952 and 1995.

Selected filmography
 The White Horse Inn (1952)
 The Last Waltz (1953)
 As Long as There Are Pretty Girls (1955)
 Operation Sleeping Bag (1955)
 Goodbye, Franziska (1957)
 The Trapp Family in America (1958)
 Taiga (1958)
 Jacqueline (1959)
 You Don't Shoot at Angels (1960)
 Dead Woman from Beverly Hills (1964)
 How to Seduce a Playboy (1966)

References

Bibliography 
 Crittenden, Roger. Fine Cuts: The Art of European Film Editing. Taylor & Francis, 2012.

External links 
 

1921 births
2014 deaths
German film editors
German women film editors